Brandywine Manufacturers Sunday School, also known as Sunday School and Hagley Office, is a historic Sunday school building located near Wilmington, New Castle County, Delaware. It was built in 1817, and is a one-story, rectangular stone building.  It measures 31 feet by 65 feet and features an Ionic order columned portico and school bell tower.  Also on the property is a contributing spring house. It was built for workers, old and young, to learn the basics of reading, writing, and "ciphering," and remained in use as a school until 1851.  From 1902 to 1921, it was the Hagley Yard office of the E. I. du Pont de Nemours Company. It was then converted to a private dwelling.

It was added to the National Register of Historic Places in 1972.

References

External links

 Brandywine Manufacturers Sunday School records at Hagley Museum and Library

School buildings on the National Register of Historic Places in Delaware
Religious buildings and structures completed in 1817
Schools in Wilmington, Delaware
Sunday schools
National Register of Historic Places in Wilmington, Delaware